was a Japanese professional wrestling event co-promoted by Big Japan Pro Wrestling (BJW), DDT Pro-Wrestling (DDT) and Kaientai Dojo (K-Dojo). The event featured ten matches on December 31, 2009, at Korakuen Hall in Tokyo, Japan. It aired on Fighting TV Samurai on January 8, 2010.

The event was part of the Tenka Sanbun no Kei series of shows co-produced by BJW, DDT and K-Dojo from 2007 to 2015, and the first in the New Year's Eve Pro-Wrestling brand of events.

The event was headlined by a Rumble match featuring 108 participants, the largest known to date. The number "108" is significant in the Japanese traditional celebrations on the last day of the year (Ōmisoka) as it is the number of times Buddhist temples ring their bell (bonshō) in order to cleanse the people of each of the 108 earthly temptations.

Production

Background
From 2007 to 2015, BJW, DDT and K-Dojo have held the Tenka Sanbun no Kei tours featuring the three promotions in joint events in which BJW, DDT and K-Dojo held shows in the morning, afternoon and night at the same venue on the same day. Occasionally, the three promotions also held joint shows. The 2009 New Year's Eve special was the final event of the third tour that started on December 13.

Storylines
The show featured ten professional wrestling matches that resulted from scripted storylines, where wrestlers portray villains, heroes, or less distinguishable characters in the scripted events that build tension and culminate in a wrestling match or series of matches.

Results

Four-way tag team elimination match

Now Leader vs. New Leader 5-on-5 elimination match

New Year's Eve Rumble entrances and eliminations
 – BJW
 – DDT
 – K-Dojo
 – Freelancer
 – Winner

References

2009 in professional wrestling
Active Advance Pro Wrestling
Big Japan Pro Wrestling shows
DDT Pro-Wrestling shows
Professional wrestling in Tokyo
Holidays themed professional wrestling events